"Dusted" is the second single released from Leftfield's album Rhythm and Stealth. It was released on CD and 12" on 15 November 1999 on the Hard Hands record label, published by Chrysalis Music. The song reached number 28 on the UK Singles Chart. It features vocals by Roots Manuva, which were recorded in 1997, prior to his mainstream success as a solo artist.

Music video
The music video for the song was released on the Studio !K7 compilation DVD, Extra: A Collection of Outstanding Electronic Music.

Formats and track listings

CD1
 "Dusted" – 4:49
 "Dusted" (Pressure Drop Remix) – 4:01
 "Dusted" (Si Begg's Buckfunk 3000 Remix) – 5:44
 "Dusted" (Howie B Instrumental Remix) – 3:51

CD2
 "Dusted" (X-ecutioners Remix) – 3:16
 "Dusted" (Howie B Vocal Remix) – 5:46
 "Dusted" (Tipper Remix) – 4:42

12"
 "Dusted" (Si Begg's Buckfunk 3000 Remix) – 5:44
 "Dusted" (X-ecutioners Remix) – 3:16
 "Dusted" (Pressure Drop Remix) – 4:01

European CD release
 "Dusted" – 4:49
 "Dusted" (Pressure Drop Remix) – 4:01
 "Dusted" (Howie B Instrumental Remix) – 3:51
 "Dusted" (X-ecutioners Remix) – 3:16
 "Dusted" (Tipper Remix) – 4:42

US CD release
 "Dusted" (Album Version) – 4:49
 "Dusted" (Pressure Drop Remix) – 4:01
 "Dusted" (Howie B Instrumental Remix) – 3:51
 "Dusted" (The X-ecutioners Remix) – 3:16
 "Dusted" (Tipper Remix) – 4:42
 "Dusted" (Howie B Vocal Remix) – 5:46
 "Dusted" (Si Begg's Buckfunk 3000 Remix) – 5:44

Australian CD release
 "Dusted" (Album Version) – 4:49
 "Dusted" (Pressure Drop Remix) – 4:01
 "Dusted" (Howie B Vocal Remix) – 5:46
 "Dusted" (X-ecutioners Remix) – 3:16
 "Dusted" (Tipper Remix) – 4:42

Charts

References

1999 singles
1999 songs
Leftfield songs
Chrysalis Records singles